Erste Wahl is the debut studio album by German recording artist Johannes Oerding. It was released by Columbia Records on August 21, 2009 in German-speaking Europe.

Track listing

Charts

Certifications

References

2009 albums
Johannes Oerding albums